The UEFA Cup Winners' Cup (called European Cup Winners' Cup prior to 1994–95) was a seasonal association football competition contested between member associations of European football's governing body, the Union of European Football Associations (UEFA). It was open to winners of domestic cup competitions, such as the English FA Cup champions. Throughout its 39-year history, the UEFA Cup Winners' Cup was always a knock-out tournament with two-legged home and away ties until the single match final staged at a neutral venue, the only exception to this being the two-legged final in the competition's first year. The first competition was won by Fiorentina, from Italy, who defeated Scotland's Rangers 4–1 over two legs to win the 1961 final. The competition was abolished in 1999; Italian team Lazio were the last team to win the competition when they beat Mallorca 2–1.

Barcelona are the most successful club in the competition's history, having won it on four occasions, followed by Anderlecht (Belgium), Milan (Italy), Chelsea (England) and Dynamo Kyiv (USSR / Ukraine) with two victories each. Barcelona, Atlético Madrid, Real Madrid (all from Spain), Anderlecht (Belgium), Rangers (Scotland), Arsenal (England) and Rapid Wien (Austria) hold the record for being runners-up the most times, with each team losing the final twice. Teams from England won the competition eight times, more than any other country. Additionally, England provided nine different teams in the finals, seven of which went on to win the trophy at least once, both also records.

List of finals

 The "Season" column refers to the season the competition was held, and wikilinks to the article about that season.
 The wikilinks in the "Final score" column point to the article about that season's final game.

Performances

By club

By nation

See also
List of UEFA Cup Winners' Cup winning managers
List of European Cup and UEFA Champions League finals
List of UEFA Cup and Europa League finals
List of UEFA Super Cup matches
List of UEFA Intertoto Cup winners
List of UEFA Women's Cup and Women's Champions League finals

Notes

References

External links
UEFA Cup Winners' Cup official history

UEFA Cup Winners' Cup
 
UEFA Cup Winners' Cup